Escape from Recsk is a 1997 Hungarian-Polish-German drama film directed by Lívia Gyarmathy.

References

External links 

1997 drama films
1997 films
Hungarian drama films
Polish drama films
German drama films
1990s German films